Joseph Wirt Tillotson (1905-1959) was a pulp painter and illustrator who used the name Robert Fuqua in his works.

Biography 
Joseph Wirt Tillotson was born January 30, 1905, in Greenville, Mississippi to parents William Wirt Tillotson and Belle Fuqua Oursler. Between 1938 and 1951, Tillotson painted an estimated 80 covers for the pulp magazine, Amazing Stories. Between 1949 and the late 1950s, he illustrated stories for 'Our Bible in Pictures published by David C. Cook.

He married Marian Tillotson, a sociology professor at the University of Chicago. They had no children. Tillotson died of liver cancer on September 1, 1959.

References 

American magazine illustrators
1905 births
1959 deaths
Golden Age comics creators
American comics artists